The 2011–12 Welsh Football League Division One began on 12 August 2011 and ended on 12 May 2012.

Team changes from 2010–11
Afan Lido were promoted to the Welsh Premier League.

Haverfordwest County were relegated from the Welsh Premier League.

AFC Porth, Cwmaman Institute and Ton Pentre were promoted from the Welsh Football League Division Two.

Caldicot Town, Garden Village, Penrhiwceiber Rangers were relegated to the Welsh Football League Division Two.

League table

Results

External links
 Welsh Football League

Welsh Football League Division One seasons
2011–12 in Welsh football leagues
Wales